MJ the Musical, also referred to as simply MJ, is a jukebox musical featuring the music of Michael Jackson with a book by Lynn Nottage. It tells the story of American singer, songwriter, and dancer Michael Jackson.

MJ was originally scheduled to premiere on Broadway in mid-2020, with direction and choreography by Christopher Wheeldon. Initial plans to open were postponed due to the COVID-19 pandemic. On November 21, 2019, Ephraim Sykes was cast as Michael Jackson, but in June 2021 it was announced that the role would be played by Myles Frost. The production opened at the Neil Simon Theatre on February 1, 2022, with previews beginning December 6, 2021.

From its opening, MJ received mixed reviews, but has been a success at the box office. MJ was nominated for 10 Tony Awards including Best Musical, with the musical winning four awards, including Best Actor in a Musical for Myles Frost in the title role, as well as Best Choreography, Best Lighting Design and Best Sound Design. The original cast recording was also nominated for Grammy Award for Best Musical Theater Album. By March 2023, the musical had grossed $96.3 million, with an attendance of 665,000.

Synopsis
Telling the story of Michael Jackson's life, MJ features over 25 of Michael Jackson's biggest hits.

"The show takes audiences behind the scenes as Michael prepares for the 1992 Dangerous World Tour, providing an in-depth look at his process. As Michael and his collaborators rehearse their epic setlist, we are transported to pivotal creative moments from his career."

Act I 

The show starts with the cast members preparing for rehearsals for the upcoming Dangerous World Tour, during which the first show is in two days. Rob, their manager then tells them to get into their places and warm up. Michael Jackson makes his grand entrance and watches the process, which leads to an epic opening number. ("Beat It")

As MJ shares his new ideas with Rob, a woman called Rachel enters with her cameraman, Alejandro, in hopes of getting an in-depth interview with MJ (who hadn't been interviewed in 14 years). MJ sits with Rachel and recounts some of the terrors he suffered as a child and some of the memorable times when Berry Gordy played their hits on his Motown label.

As the interview carries on, MJ shares his collaboration with Quincy Jones, recording Off the Wall, Thriller, and Bad together, and how Thriller remained No.1 in the charts for over a year. After Rachel and Alejandro leave, Rob and Nick escort MJ to a press-conference downtown, where he presents his tour and hopes to raise funds for his Heal the World Foundation by Christmas 1993.

Act II 

Act II starts with MJ sharing his new ideas for the tour ("Billie Jean/"Smooth Criminal"), which Rob and Dave tell him are impossible and that he can bankrupt himself. He starts to recount a horrific accident when a spark ignited his hair in the making of an advert for Pepsi-Co. After listening to Rob go on and on with negativity, he reminds him of what Quincy Jones said to him, "Keep the faith. Don't let nobody take you down".

As the rehearsal carries on, MJ tells Rachel how the songs open up to him. However, during a break, commotion starts breaking out. Rob tries to keep Rachel away from MJ and doesn't want her near him. However, MJ manages to find her by disguising himself as a cleaner and explains to her how it is the only way he can go in public, which leads to him singing "Human Nature".

After the rehearsal, MJ explains to Rachel how emotional he feels about being the King of Pop, being loved by millions of fans, and being teased in the newspapers. He tries to have it both ways by trying to blame everything sad and weird about himself on others (especially the press, who are equated with the zombies in "Thriller"), but credit him alone for his every good deed and success. 

As Rob comes to check up on him, MJ recounts when he did the Apollo with the Jackson 5 and how he wasn't nervous. Rob tries to tell MJ how everything they created can be remembered for decades but he only replies by asking "Is it perfect", which starts the penultimate number, "Man in the Mirror". 

The show ends with MJ appearing in the middle of the stage ready to start the first show of the newly-created Dangerous World Tour ("Jam (Reprise)", "Black or White" / "Wanna Be Startin' Somethin' Reprise)".

Roles and principal casts

Original production casts

Musical numbers

Act I
"Beat It" - MJ, Company, and Orchestra
"Tabloid Junkie" / "Price of Fame" - MJ and Rachel
"Shout" / "Papa's Got a Brand New Bag" / "(Your Love Keeps Lifting Me) Higher and Higher" - Ensemble
"Climb Ev'ry Mountain" - Little Michael
"The Love You Save" / "I Want You Back" / "ABC" - Little Michael, Little Marlon, Jermaine, Tito, Jackie
"I'll Be There" - Katherine, Little Michael, MJ
"Don't Stop 'Til You Get Enough" / "Blame It on the Boogie" / "Dancing Machine" - MJ, Michael, Marlon, Jermaine, Tito, Jackie and Company
"Stranger in Moscow" - MJ
"You Can't Win" - Berry Gordy and Michael
"I Can't Help It" - Quincy Jones and  Michael
"Keep the Faith" - Quincy Jones and Michael
"Wanna Be Startin' Somethin'" - Quincy Jones, Michael, MJ, and Ensemble
"Earth Song" / "They Don't Care About Us" - MJ and Ensemble

Act II
"Billie Jean" - MJ
"Smooth Criminal" - MJ and Ensemble
"For the Love of Money" / "Can You Feel It" - Joseph Jackson, Michael, Marlon, Jermaine, Tito, Jackie and Orchestra
"Money" - Joseph Jackson
"Keep the Faith (Reprise)" - Rob, MJ, and Ensemble
"She's Out of My Life" - MJ and  Michael
"Jam" - MJ, Ensemble, and Orchestra
"Human Nature" - MJ and Rachel
"Bad" / "2 Bad" - MJ, Company and Orchestra
"Price of Fame (Reprise)" - MJ
"Thriller" - Little Michael, MJ, Joseph Jackson and Ensemble
"Man in the Mirror" - Company
"Jam (Reprise)" / "Black or White" / "Wanna Be Startin' Somethin' (Reprise)" - Company
"Working Day and Night" - Orchestra

Recordings 

Recording for the original Broadway cast album took place on February 7 and 8, 2022. The original Broadway cast recording was released on July 15, 2022. The original cast recording was nominated for a Grammy Award for Best Musical Theater Album.

Productions

Broadway (2021–present) 

MJ was set to premiere its pre-Broadway run in Chicago, US on October 29, 2019, at the Nederlander Theatre. The run would continue through December 1. The Michael Jackson estate decided to cancel the planned Chicago tryout, ostensibly due to "scheduling difficulties" brought about by an Actors' Equity Association strike. Actors Equity wasn't shouldering the blame for the cancellation, stating "It is difficult to understand how a modest delay in February would impact a run that was scheduled for late October."

The musical was expected to debut on Broadway in the summer of 2020. However, due to the COVID-19 pandemic, the production was postponed to 2021. The production is directed and choreographed by Christopher Wheeldon, and it features a book by two-time Pulitzer Prize winner Lynn Nottage. Scenery for the production is designed by Derek McLane with costuming by Paul Tazewell. Natasha Katz and Peter Nigrini are collaborating on lighting and projection designs respectively. Gareth Owen designed sound production, with hair and wig design by Charles LaPointe.

The musical was first announced in June 2018. Wheeldon spoke about the musical, stating, "The show is very much anchored in one particular moment in time. – I always bring up the fabulous movie that Spielberg made about Lincoln: You take one key moment, I suppose, in the history of someone's life and then sort of use that as an anchor point for past storytelling and, perhaps, some kind of prophecy of what's to come. We'll be doing that with this story." Asked about the dance and choreography, he said he "intend[s] to put quite a lot of Michael's work in the show".

The musical is a collaboration between The Michael Jackson Estate and Columbia Live Stage.

North American touring productions (2023-24) 
It was announced on March 21, 2022, that the show will kick off its national tour at the Nederlander Theatre, running from August 1, 2023 through May 26, 2024, with additional tour dates and casting for the tour to be announced at a later date.

West End (2024) 
It was announced on October 17, 2022, that the show will come to West End of London at the Prince Edward Theatre in March, 2024, with casting to be announced at a later date. They will hold a open audition in three locations across the UK in March of 2023.

Box office and business 
MJ has been very successful at the box office, averaging over a million dollars each week on Broadway. Following the Tonys, the show's weekly gross jumped to  $1,661,000 with sold-out shows every day and advance sales booming. It was the biggest box office jump that week on Broadway and a new high for the show. By September 4, 2022, it broke the Neil Simon theater's box office record 5 times with a total cumulative gross of $49.4 million. As of March 2023, MJ the Musical grossed around $96.3 million with 665,249 attendance and 461 performance.

Public reception
The show has attracted numerous celebrities such as Pierce Brosnan, Stevie Wonder, Paula Abdul, Lindsay Lohan, Jay-Z, Beyoncé Knowles, Madonna, Chloe Bailey, Halle Bailey and the cast of Stranger Things. Madonna would go on and say that the show made her cry, calling the performance "extraordinary"

Critical response
MJ has divided critics, with the show receiving mixed to negative reviews. Charles Isherwood of Broadway News criticized Lynn Nottage's book, in particular, writing, "where MJ loses its fleet footing is in the bland, exposition-heavy and often trite dialogue supplied by Nottage...Clichés, preachy speeches, and baldly obvious dialogue abound." Adam Feldman of Time Out wrote, "'Listen to my music,' says Michael to his interviewer. 'It answers any questions you might have.' Does it? I left the theater entertained, but not convinced I had seen the man in the smoke and mirrors." Critic Maya Phillips of The New York Times wrote, "The musical is inherently hollow; the opacity of Michael Jackson and his life of traumas and controversies make it difficult to find material compelling and cohesive enough to tell a story onstage". 

Positive attention for the show includes Deadline reporter Greg Evans who said it was "visually & sonically ravishing!", while the Chicago Tribune called the show's scenery gorgeous and the show "beautiful to experience throughout, which one almost never can say about jukebox musicals". Peter Marks of The Washington Post also praised the show and the cast, especially the "utterly persuasive" Myles Frost, and called MJ "a riveting, adrenaline rush of a show". Linda Armstrong of Amsterdam News called the production "spectacular", "stunning" and "off-the-charts". Joe Westerfield of Newsweek said, "In many ways MJ is a living, breathing, even breathless, music video, but with that touch of inspiration, drive and art that only Michael Jackson can provide." 

Blogs have been favorable to the show. Ayanna Prescod of the New York Theatre Guide gave the musical a perfect score and called it "a flawless production". Patrick Christiano of Theater Life called it a "thrilling tribute of - the greatest entertainer of all time" and said "If audience reaction is any indication MJ is a hit worthy of The King of Pop’s impeccable standards". Brittany Crowell of The Front Row Center also almost gave it a near perfect score, stating that the show is "full of skill, craft and true entertainment".

Awards and nominations

Original Broadway productions

See also 
 Motown: The Musical, a 2013 musical about Motown record label

References

External links
 

2021 musicals
Biographical musicals
Broadway musicals
Cultural depictions of Michael Jackson
Jukebox musicals
Tony Award-winning musicals